Deepak Shirke (born 29 April 1957) is an Indian actor who is known for his work in Hindi and Marathi films. He has been involved with more than 100 Hindi films, usually playing the role of the villain. Shirke has also worked in the Hindi television industry in the crime series C.I.D. as ACP Digvijay which aired on Sony TV.

Filmography 
His career extends from late 1980s to 2014 of which the best known films are Daag: The Fire, Anth, Tirangaa, Ishq, Judwaa, Bhai and Sarkar (film). He played the character of Constable Gaikwad in the Bharatiya Digital Party made web-series Pandu.

References

20th-century Indian male actors
21st-century Indian male actors
Indian male film actors
Male actors in Hindi cinema
Indian male television actors
Living people
Place of birth missing (living people)
1957 births